The Statute Law (Ireland) Revision Act 1872 (35 & 36 Vict c 98) is an Act of the Parliament of the United Kingdom which repealed, as to Ireland, certain Acts of the Parliament of England which had been extended to the then Lordship of Ireland by royal writs or acts of the Parliament of Ireland down to Poynings' Law (1495). The act was intended, in particular, to make the revised edition of the statutes already published applicable to Ireland. The repeals largely mirrored those made for England and Wales by the Statute Law Revision Act 1863. The Statute Law Revision (Ireland) Act 1878 repealed acts of the Parliament of Ireland.

This Act was retained for the Republic of Ireland by the Statute Law Revision Act 2007. and remains in force there .

See also
Statute Law Revision Act

References

Sources
 Halsbury's Statutes

Citations

United Kingdom Acts of Parliament 1872